TDRS-11, known before launch as TDRS-K, is an American communications satellite which is operated by NASA as part of the Tracking and Data Relay Satellite System. The eleventh Tracking and Data Relay Satellite is the first third-generation spacecraft.

TDRS-11 was constructed by Boeing, and is based on the BSS-601HP satellite bus. It carries two steerable antennas capable of providing S, Ku and Ka band communications for other spacecraft, plus an array of additional S-band transponders to allow communications at a lower data rate with greater numbers of spacecraft.

TDRS-11 was launched at 01:48 UTC on 31 January 2013, at the beginning of a 40-minute launch window. United Launch Alliance performed the launch using an Atlas V carrier rocket, tail number AV-036, flying in the 401 configuration. Liftoff occurred from Space Launch Complex 41 at the Cape Canaveral Air Force Station, and the rocket placed its payload into a geostationary transfer orbit.

Following its arrival in geosynchronous orbit, the satellite underwent on-orbit testing. It was handed over to NASA in August 2013, receiving its operational designation TDRS-11. After its arrival on-station at 171 degrees west the satellite began its final phase of testing prior to entry into service at the end of November. As of May 2020, it was positioned at 174 degrees west.

See also 

 List of TDRS satellites

References

Spacecraft launched in 2013
Satellites using the BSS-601 bus
Communications satellites in geostationary orbit
TDRS satellites
Spacecraft launched by Atlas rockets